The men's 1000 metres in short track speed skating at the 2014 Winter Olympics was held between 13–15 February 2014 at the Iceberg Skating Palace in Sochi, Russia.

The qualifying heats were held on 13 February with the quarterfinal, the semifinal and the final were held on 15 February.

The 2010 Olympic Champion was Lee Jung-Su of South Korea, who did not run. The defending World Champion was Sin Da-woon, also of South Korea. He did not win a medal.

Viktor Ahn and Vladimir Grigorev, both of Russia, won the gold and the silver medals, respectively. Sjinkie Knegt of the Netherlands became third. The medals of Ahn and Grigorev became the first ever gold and silver medals of Russia in short track speed skating, whereas the medal of Knegt became the first ever medal of the Netherlands in short track speed skating.

Gold medal won in this event featured Chelyabinsk meteor fragment to commemorate at first anniversary of this meteor strike.

Qualification
Countries were assigned quotas using a combination of the four special Olympic Qualification classifications that were held at two world cups in November 2013. A nation may enter a maximum of three athletes per event. For this event a total of 32 athletes representing 14 nations qualified to compete.

Results
The final results:

Preliminaries
 Q – qualified for Quarterfinals
 ADV – advanced
 PEN – penalty

Quarterfinal
 Q – qualified for the semifinals
 ADV – advanced
 PEN – penalty
 YC – yellow card

Semifinals

Finals

Final B (Classification Round)

Final A (Medal Round)

Final standings
The final overall standings were:

References

Men's short track speed skating at the 2014 Winter Olympics